Bernd Schmidt (born 1 December 1943) is a German former footballer who played as a defender or midfielder. He spent seven seasons in the Bundesliga with SV Werder Bremen.

Honours
Werder Bremen
 Bundesliga runner-up: 1968

References

External links
 

Living people
1943 births
Association football midfielders
German footballers
KSV Hessen Kassel players
SV Werder Bremen players
FSV Frankfurt players
Bundesliga players
People from Alsfeld
Sportspeople from Giessen (region)
Footballers from Hesse